The Sallie Chisum Robert House is a historic house in Artesia, New Mexico. It was built with cast stone in 1908 for Sallie Chisum Robert, one of Artesia's co-founders whose uncle was the cattle baron John Chisum. Born in Texas, she married a German immigrant, William Robert, only to divorce him and become a homesteader in Artesia; she later moved to Roswell, New Mexico. The house was designed in the Dutch Colonial Revival architectural style, with a gambrel roof. It was added to New Mexico's State Register of Cultural Properties in 1977. It has been listed on the National Register of Historic Places since March 2, 1984.

References

Houses on the National Register of Historic Places in New Mexico
National Register of Historic Places in Eddy County, New Mexico
Dutch Colonial Revival architecture in the United States
Houses completed in 1908